KNLY (91.1 MHz) is an FM radio station in The Woodlands, Texas operated by Northwood Hispanic Communication Center. Licensed to New Waverly, it broadcasts a Variety format, which mainly consists of English and Spanish Top 40, Regional Mexican, Modern Country, Urban Contemporary, and Dance music.

External links

 
 
 

Contemporary hit radio stations in the United States
NLY
NLY
The Woodlands, Texas
Radio stations established in 2014
2014 establishments in Texas